Brent A. Barlow is a former professor of marriage, family and human development at Brigham Young University (BYU).  He is now retired.  He has written several articles and books on topics related to marriage and family.

Books by Barlow include Just for Newlyweds, Twelve Traps in Today's marriages and how to Avoid Them, What Husbands Expect of Wives, Worth Waiting For: Sexual Abstinence Before Marriage and What Wives Expect of Husbands.  He has also written articles on such topics on inter-faith marriage by Mormons.

Barlow is a member of the Church of Jesus Christ of Latter-day Saints.

Barlow has also served as chairman of the Governor's Commission on Marriage in Utah.

Barlow received both a BA in Psychology and an MA in Religious Education from BYU.  He earned his Ph.D. in Marriage and Family Relations from Florida State University.  Prior to joining the BYU faculty, Barlow taught at Southern Illinois University and the University of Wisconsin–Stout.

Barlow's masters thesis was on the history of the Church of Jesus Christ of Latter-day Saints in Ireland from 1840 on.  He wrote the article "The Irish Experience" in V. Ben Bloxham, et al., ed., Truth Will Prevail: The Rise of The Church of Jesus Christ of Latter-day Saints in the British Isles, 1837-1987 (Cambridge University Press, 1987).

References

Further reading
Article by Barlow on divorce rates
BYU faculty bio page
Article on his wedding anniversary

Latter Day Saints from Utah
Brigham Young University alumni
Brigham Young University faculty
Florida State University alumni
Living people
Southern Illinois University faculty
Latter Day Saints from Florida
Latter Day Saints from Illinois
Latter Day Saints from Wisconsin
Year of birth missing (living people)